Wallace's Cave is situated in Roslin Glen, in Midlothian, Scotland.  It is also known as Hawthornden Castle Cave, after Hawthornden Castle which is nearby.  It takes its name from William Wallace, the Scottish national hero, who participated in the Battle of Roslin, which took place close to the cave on 24 February 1303.

References

Landforms of Midlothian
Caves of Scotland